Marquis River may refer to several places:

Marquis River (Grenada)
Marquis River (Saint Lucia)

See also 
 Marquis (disambiguation)